is a Japanese former swimmer. He competed in the men's 200 metre breaststroke at the 1964 Summer Olympics.

References

External links
 

1941 births
Living people
Japanese male breaststroke swimmers
Olympic swimmers of Japan
Swimmers at the 1964 Summer Olympics
Place of birth missing (living people)
Universiade medalists in swimming
Universiade silver medalists for Japan
Medalists at the 1961 Summer Universiade
20th-century Japanese people